Star Airways was an airline based in Tirana, Albania. It was founded by several Albanian and Italian investors in 2008,  and obtained its operating license in June 2009. On April 3, 2010, Star Airways received its first aircraft, an Airbus A320. Its second A320 arrived in May of the same year. The airline ceased all operations in September 2010.

History
Star Airways was founded by several Albanian and Italian investors and received the operating license in June 2009. On April 3, 2010, Star Airways received its first aircraft, an Airbus A320-231 with registration ZA-RED, previously operated by the Mexican airline Mexicana de Aviación had been in action. Their second aircraft, an Airbus A320-211 previously operated by Nouvelair, arrived in May of the same year. Both aircraft were leased through the lessor ILFC.  

On June 7, 2010, Star Airways commenced operations using two McDonnell Douglas MD-82 jetliners provided by ItAli Airlines as it had not received approval to operate with its own aircraft. With scheduled flights from Tirana to several Italian cities, there were plans to expand routes to other cities such as Istanbul, Antalya, Thessaloniki and Düsseldorf.
However, in the summer of 2010, the Albanian aviation authority withdrew its operating license and all flight operations were stopped completely in September of that year.

Fleet

Two (2) Airbus A320
Two (2) McDonnell Douglas MD-82 (operated by ItAli Airlines)

See also
 List of defunct airlines of Albania

References

Defunct airlines of Albania
Airlines established in 2008
Airlines disestablished in 2010
2008 establishments in Albania
2010 disestablishments in Albania